PeerForward, formerly College Summit, is a national nonprofit organization dedicated to improving the lives of low-income youth by connecting them to college and career. In high schools across the nation, PeerForward trains and deploys teams of influential juniors and seniors to drive key actions by classmates that will improve postsecondary enrollment and success.

History 
In 1993, Keith Frome Ed.D, J.B. Schramm and Derek Canty started a teen education center in the basement of a community center in low-income in Washington, D.C., working with students who had the intelligence, resiliency, and grit to success in college and careers, but did not know how to pursue post secondary education. Through this program, they saw firsthand how the influence of one student could push friends on the path to a higher education. They founded College Summit incorporated in 1996, now doing business as PeerForward, by answering a simple, yet important question: "Who is the most influential person to a 17-year-old?" The answer: "Another 17-year old." 

In 2015, College Summit launched PeerForward, an initiative built on decades of experience as well as third-party research about what really works in schools. A Stanford Social Innovation Review essay, "Cutting Costs to Increase Impact" analyzed this innovative approach to achieving scale. In the 2017–18 school year, 114 teams of influential 11th- and 12th-graders trained by PeerForward mobilized to run campaigns (events, peer-to-peer coaching, awareness) to reach 110,000 of their classmates and peers. Independent researchers from the University of Pittsburgh found that PeerForward high schools had a 26% higher rate of Free Application for Federal Student Aid [FAFSA] completing that similar schools without the program. The effect – unlocking an estimated $13M more in grants and scholarships to pay for school.

References

External links 
 

Educational organizations based in the United States